La duda (The Doubt) is a telenovela broadcast in Mexico by the TV Azteca network.

Cast

 Silvia Navarro ... Victoria 
 Víctor González Reynoso ... Julian 
 Sergio Bustamante ... Adolfo 
 Julieta Egurrola ... Teresa 
 Omar Germenos ... Gabriel 
 Leonardo Daniel ... Jorge 
 Elizabeth Cervantes ... Valentina 
 Marta Aura ... Azucena 
 Pedro Sicard ... Arturo 
 José Carlos Rodríguez ... Mario 
 Adriana Parra ... Jacinta 
 Alejandra Lazcano ... Graciela 
 Martín Altomaro ... Luis 
 Ana Laura Espinosa ... Romualda 
 Ángeles Cruz ... Dominga 
 Luisa Dander ... Tachita 
 Marco Antonio Treviño ... Martín 
 Socorro de la Campa ... Rosa 
 Andrés Palacios ... Chimino 
 Alberto Casanova ... Lencho 
 Saby Kamalich ... Elvira 
 Carolina Carvajal ... Carolina 
 Arleta Jeziorska ... Florenza 
 Alejandro Lukini ... Humberto 
 Jesús Ochoa ... Santiago 
 Fabiana Perzabal ... Karla 
 Maribel Rodríguez ... Margarita 
 María Rojo ... Amelia 
 Daniela Spanic ... Blanca

2002 telenovelas
2002 Mexican television series debuts
2002 Mexican television series endings
Mexican telenovelas
Spanish-language telenovelas
TV Azteca telenovelas